Charles-François d'Iberville, marquis de La Bonde (1653–1723) was a French aristocrat and diplomat.

After serving in Geneva, Genoa, Mainz and Madrid, he was posted by King Louis XIV as Ambassador to the Court of St James's from 1713 until 1717.

See also 
 List of Ambassadors of France to the United Kingdom

Notes

1653 births
1723 deaths
University of Paris alumni
18th-century French diplomats
Ambassadors of France to the United Kingdom